John Bergman (born June 7, 1962) is an American former weightlifter. He competed in the men's super heavyweight event at the 1988 Summer Olympics.

References

External links
 

1962 births
Living people
American male weightlifters
Olympic weightlifters of the United States
Weightlifters at the 1988 Summer Olympics
Place of birth missing (living people)
Pan American Games medalists in weightlifting
Pan American Games silver medalists for the United States
Weightlifters at the 1987 Pan American Games
20th-century American people
21st-century American people